is a subway station on the  Fukuoka City Subway Nanakuma Line in Jōnan-ku, Fukuoka in Japan. Its station symbol is a picture of a black kite in blue, the symbol of the Fukuoka University.

Lines

Platforms

Vicinity
Fukuoka University
Fukuoka University Hospital
Fukuoka University Graduate School of Nursing
Nishitetsu bus stop

History
February 3, 2005: Opening of the station

References

Railway stations in Japan opened in 2005
Railway stations in Fukuoka Prefecture
Nanakuma Line
Railway stations at university and college campuses